The 2021 Mid-American Conference men's basketball tournament was the postseason men's basketball tournament for the Mid-American Conference (MAC). Due to the ongoing COVID-19 pandemic, the entire tournament was held at Rocket Mortgage FieldHouse, in Cleveland, Ohio, from March 11-13, 2021. For the 2021 tournament, only the top eight teams qualified. The winner of the tournament received the MAC's automatic bid to the 2021 NCAA tournament. Ohio defeated Buffalo in the final. Jason Preston of Ohio was named the tournament MVP. In the NCAA tournament Ohio defeated No. 4-seeded Virginia in the First Round before falling to No. 5-seeded Creighton in the Second Round.

Seeds
8 out of the 12 MAC teams qualified for the tournament. Teams were seeded by record within the conference, with a tiebreaker system to seed teams with identical conference records.

Schedule

Bracket

* denotes overtime period

All-Tournament Team
Tournament MVP – Jason Preston, Ohio

References

2021
2020–21 Mid-American Conference men's basketball season
Basketball competitions in Cleveland
MAC men's basketball tournament
College sports tournaments in Ohio
2020s in Cleveland